The 1983 Talladega 500 was a NASCAR Winston Cup Series event on July 31, 1983, at Alabama International Motor Speedway in Talladega, Alabama.

Background
Talladega Superspeedway, originally known as Alabama International Motor Superspeedway (AIMS), is a motorsports complex located north of Talladega, Alabama. It is located on the former Anniston Air Force Base in the small city of Lincoln. The track is a Tri-oval and was constructed by International Speedway Corporation, a business controlled by the France Family, in the 1960s. Talladega is most known for its steep banking and the unique location of the start/finish line - located just past the exit to pit road. The track currently hosts the NASCAR series such as the Sprint Cup Series, Xfinity Series, and the Camping World Truck Series.

Qualifying

Qualifying results

Race
Forty drivers made the grid; Trevor Boys was the only driver not to be born in the United States. The race lasted almost three hours for the scheduled 188 laps. Dick Skillen was the last-place finisher due to a crash on the first lap with Travis Tiller, Tommy Gale, Billie Harvey, Grant Adcox, and Neil Bonnett. J.D. McDuffie was the lowest-finishing driver to finish the race; he was 44 laps behind the leaders. 95,000 people attended this race. Neil Bonnett was leading the race with 12 laps to go when he pitted for fuel only. The car stalled and it took long enough to get it re-fired that Earnhardt and Waltrip were able to get by.

Dale Earnhardt would defeat Darrell Waltrip by four car lengths in this race; securing his last victory for an owner other than Richard Childress. Harvey and Tiller would retire from NASCAR after this race. Individual earnings for each driver ranged from the winner's share of $46,950 ($ when adjusted for inflation) to the last-place finisher's share of $1,450 ($ when adjusted for inflation). The total prize purse was $316,700 ($ when adjusted for inflation).

Race results

† Bonnett crashed his car on lap 2, but drove Richmond's car after Richmond retired due to debris in his eyes

Race summary
 Lead changes: 46 among different drivers
 Cautions/Laps: 2 for 16
 Red flags: 0    
 Time of race: 2 hours, 55 minutes and 52 seconds
 Average speed:

Media

Television

Radio

Standings after the race

Drivers' Championship standings

Manufacturers' Championship standings

Note: Only the first 10 positions are included for the driver standings.

References

Talladega 500
Talladega 500
NASCAR races at Talladega Superspeedway